In enzymology, a vinorine synthase is an enzyme that catalyzes the chemical reaction

acetyl-CoA + 16-epivellosimine  CoA + vinorine

Thus, the two substrates of this enzyme are acetyl-CoA and 16-epivellosimine, whereas its two products are CoA and vinorine.

This enzyme belongs to the family of transferases, specifically those acyltransferases transferring groups other than aminoacyl groups.  The systematic name of this enzyme class is acyl-CoA:16-epivellosimine O-acetyltransferase (cyclizing). This enzyme participates in indole and ipecac alkaloid biosynthesis.

Structural studies

As of late 2007, only one structure has been solved for this class of enzymes, with the PDB accession code .

References

 
 
 
 

EC 2.3.1
Enzymes of known structure